The grey antbird (Cercomacra cinerascens) is a species of bird in the antbird family Thamnophilidae.
It is found in Bolivia, Brazil, Colombia, Ecuador, French Guiana, Guyana, Peru, Suriname, and Venezuela.
Its natural habitat is subtropical or tropical moist lowland forests.

The male is grey with a darker grey tail. The female is olive brown above, pale ochre brown below and has a darker brown tail. The white spotting on the wings and on the tail of the female is similar to that on the male.

Taxonomy
The grey antbird was described by the English zoologist Philip Sclater in 1857 from a specimen obtained near the Rio Napo in Ecuador. He coined the binomial name Formicivora cinerascens. The specific epithet is Late Latin meaning "ashen". This antbird is now placed in the genus Cercomacra that was introduced by Sclater in 1858.

Four subspecies are recognised:
 C. c. cinerascens (Sclater, PL, 1857) – southeast Colombia and south Venezuela to east Ecuador, northeast Peru and northwest Amazonian Brazil
 C. c. immaculata Chubb, C, 1918 – east Venezuela, the Guianas and northeast Brazil
 C. c. sclateri Hellmayr, 1905 – east Peru, northwest Bolivia and southwest Amazonian Brazil
 C. c. iterata Zimmer, JT, 1932 – southeast Amazonian Brazil and northeast Bolivia

References

External links
Image at ADW

grey antbird
Birds of the Amazon Basin
Birds of the Guianas
grey antbird
grey antbird
Birds of Brazil
Taxonomy articles created by Polbot